The North American Division (NAD) of Seventh-day Adventists is a sub-entity of the General Conference of Seventh-day Adventists, which oversees the Church's work in the United States, Canada, French possessions of St. Pierre and Miquelon, the British overseas territory of Bermuda, the US territories in the Pacific of Guam, Wake Island, Northern Mariana Islands, and three states in free association with the United States - Palau, the Marshall Islands, and the Federated States of Micronesia. Founded in 1913, its headquarters in the same building as the General Conference, moved to separate quarters in Columbia, Maryland in 2017. , the Division's membership was 1,267,711.

Organization

The North American Division is divided into nine Union Conferences, one National Church, and one attached Mission. The Unions and National Church are divided into local Conferences. Nine of these local Conferences are African-American Conferences (AAC) that share the same territory with other local Conferences.

History

See also
Seventh-day Adventist Church
List of Seventh-day Adventist hospitals
List of Seventh-day Adventist secondary schools
List of Seventh-day Adventist colleges and universities

References

External links

Adventist organizations established in the 20th century
Seventh-day Adventist Church in North America